Unjividuthy is a village in the Orathanadu taluk of Thanjavur district, Tamil Nadu, India.

Demographics 

As per the 2001 census, Unjividuthy had a total population of 3090 with 1538 males and 1552 females. The sex ratio was 1009. The literacy rate was 65.08.

References 

 

Villages in Thanjavur district